Ponta Garça is a civil parish in the municipality of Vila Franca do Campo in the Portuguese archipelago of the Azores. The population in 2011 was 3,547, in an area of 29.35 km2. It is the largest parish in Vila Franca do Campo.

History
Gaspar Frutuoso indicated that the origin of its toponymy was connected with the first settlers' reflections on sighting this zone. On the other hand, the local civil parish council claims that the area was named for the preponderance of marine birds, that nest on the cliffs of the parish.

The civil parish was first designated in the 16th century, likely owing to the communities growth and access to potable water.

Geography
The parish is located along the main regional roadway that links Lagoa and Ponta Delgada with the eastern part of the island. It is situated in the eastern part of Vila Franca do Campo. It contains the localities Cinzeiro, Meio Moio, Ponta Garça and Senhora das Mercês. Ponta Garça has 3 elementary schools, and a church.

Climate

Economy
The main industries are agriculture and manufacturing.

Architecture

Civic
 Estate of the Viscount Botelho
 Lighthouse of Ponta Garça, the 20th century lighthouse includes a single circular tower and main block, similar to other modernist structures of this type, such as the lighthouse of Ponta dos Rosais; considered emblematic of the region, it was constructed in 1957, and includes a  tower, with view of the sea and parish.

Religious
 Church of Nossa Senhora da Piedade
 Hermitage of Senhora das Mercês, situated in Grotas Fundas, this hermitage dates from the 18th century, and includes an image in high-relief dating from the same period.

References

Freguesias of Vila Franca do Campo (Azores)